This article concerns the period 259 BC – 250 BC.

References